Asterolecanium is a genus of pit scale insects. Asterolecanium is distributed worldwide: species have been found in each of the six biogeographic realms, and nearly all of their respective subregions.

Many species of Asterolecanium are destructive to crops and other plants of economic importance such as bamboo and oak, and are therefore considered pests. Asterolecanium species have been found on at least 37 plant families, most prominently Gramineae (grasses), Palmae (palm trees), and Fagaceae (beech trees). Some species prefer a single host, while others feed on multiple host species. Some feed only on a single part of a plant, such as leaves or stems, while others infest the whole plant. Some create pits in their hosts, depending on the susceptibility of the host plant to damage.

Species 

Asterolecanium abiectum Russell
Asterolecanium acaciae Morrison & Morrison
Asterolecanium acutulum Russell
Asterolecanium adjunctum Russell
Asterolecanium amboinae Russell
Asterolecanium boliviae Russell
Asterolecanium borboniae Brain
Asterolecanium borneese Russell
Asterolecanium bornmuelleri Ruebsaamen
Asterolecanium brevispinum Brain
Asterolecanium brunetae Russell
Asterolecanium captiosum Russell
Asterolecanium castaneae Russell
Asterolecanium chinae Russell
Asterolecanium circulare Russell
Asterolecanium coffeae Newstead, 1911
Asterolecanium conimbrigense Saraiva, 1936
Asterolecanium conspicuum Brain
Asterolecanium corallinum Takahashi, 1908
Asterolecanium delicatum Green
Asterolecanium difficile Russell
Asterolecanium disiunctum Russell
Asterolecanium distinctum Russell
Asterolecanium elongatum Russell
Asterolecanium epidendri (Bouché, 1844)
Asterolecanium euphorbiae Russell
Asterolecanium euryopsis Fuller
Asterolecanium exiguum Green
Asterolecanium flagellariae Russell
Asterolecanium florum Russell
Asterolecanium fusum Russell
Asterolecanium garciniae Russell
Asterolecanium gemmae Russell
Asterolecanium gilvum Russell
Asterolecanium grandiculum Russell
Asterolecanium greeni Marchal
Asterolecanium gutta Green
Asterolecanium hakeae Fuller
Asterolecanium hilli Green
Asterolecanium inconspicuum Russell
Asterolecanium ingae Russell
Asterolecanium inlabefactum Russell
Asterolecanium inusitatum Russell
Asterolecanium japonica Cockerell, 1900
Asterolecanium javae Russell
Asterolecanium lacrimula Russell
Asterolecanium largum Russell
Asterolecanium launeae Russell
Asterolecanium longulum Russell
Asterolecanium longum 
Asterolecanium luteolum Russell
Asterolecanium machili Russell, 1941
Asterolecanium medium Russell
Asterolecanium miliaris (Boisduval, 1869)
Asterolecanium minicum Russell
Asterolecanium minus 
Asterolecanium minusculum Russell
Asterolecanium minutum Takahashi, 1930
Asterolecanium multiporum 
Asterolecanium nitidum Russell
Asterolecanium notatum Lambdin
Asterolecanium oblongum Russell
Asterolecanium oraniae Russell
Asterolecanium ordinarium Russell
Asterolecanium pallidum Russell
Asterolecanium parvum Russell
Asterolecanium penicillatum Russell
Asterolecanium perplexum Russell
Asterolecanium pinangae Russell
Asterolecanium proboscidis Russell
Asterolecanium pseudolanceoleatum Takahashi, 1933
Asterolecanium pseudomiliaris Green, 1922
Asterolecanium psychotriae Russell, 1941
Asterolecanium pusillum Russell
Asterolecanium pustulans (Cockerell, 1892)
Asterolecanium puteanum Russell
Asterolecanium quadrisetosum Russell
Asterolecanium quaesitum Russell
Asterolecanium rehi Rübsaamen, 1902
Asterolecanium robustum Green, 1908
Asterolecanium rubrocomatum Green
Asterolecanium sabalis Russell
Asterolecanium sanbernardensis Hempel
Asterolecanium sasae Russell
Asterolecanium scirrosis Russell, 1941
Asterolecanium seabrai Saraiva, 1936
Asterolecanium semisepultum Russell
Asterolecanium simile Russell
Asterolecanium simplex Russell
Asterolecanium singulare Russell
Asterolecanium skanianae Russell
Asterolecanium subdolum Russell
Asterolecanium subventruosum Russell
Asterolecanium thespesiae Green
Asterolecanium townsendi Cockerell
Asterolecanium transversus Morrison & Morrison
Asterolecanium truncatum Russell
Asterolecanium ungulatum Russell
Asterolecanium unicum Russell
Asterolecanium urichi Cockerell
Asterolecanium victoriae Russell
Asterolecanium viridulum (Cockerell)
Asterolecanium vitreum Russell
Asterolecanium vulgare Russell
Asterolecanium zanthens Russell

References

Agricultural pest insects
Insects of Africa
Asterolecaniidae
Sternorrhyncha genera